Kurt Einsiedel (12 February 1907 – 25 March 1960) was a German cyclist. He competed in the team pursuit and time trial events at the 1928 Summer Olympics.

References

External links
 

1907 births
1960 deaths
German male cyclists
Olympic cyclists of Germany
Cyclists at the 1928 Summer Olympics
People from Altenburg
Cyclists from Thuringia
20th-century German people